"Bela ciganka" ("White Gypsy") is a song recorded by Serbian pop-folk recording artist Stoja. It was released as a non-album single 4 November 2013. The song was written by Stoja's longtime songwriter Stevan Simeunović and produced by Aleksandar Kobac.

A preview of the song was uploaded to her YouTube account on 2 November 2015, with the full song being released two days later and performed for the first time on the television show BN Koktel on BN Televizija.

References

2013 singles
2013 songs
BN Music singles
Pop-folk songs